Renewable energy in Bangladesh refers to the use of renewable energy to generate electricity in Bangladesh. The current renewable energy comes from biogas that is originated from biomass, hydro power, solar and wind.

Solar power 

The long term average sunshine data indicates that the period of bright sunshine hours in the coastal regions of Bangladesh varies from 3 to 11 hours daily.  The insolation in Bangladesh varies from 3.8 kWh/m2/day to 6.4 kWh/m2/day at an average of 5 kWh/m2/day. These indicate that there are good prospects for solar thermal and photovoltaic application in the country.

With an estimated 40% of the population in Bangladesh having no access to electricity, the government introduced a scheme known as solar home systems (SHS) to provide electricity to households with no grid access. The program reached 3 million households as of late 2014 and, with more than 50,000 systems being added per month since 2009, the World Bank has called it "the fastest growing solar home system program in the world."

The Bangladeshi government is working towards universal electricity access by 2021 with the SHS program projected to cover 6 million households by 2017.

Wind power 
The long term wind flow, especially in the islands and the southern coastal belt of Bangladesh indicate that the average wind speed remains between 3 and 4.5 m/s for the months of March to September and 1.7 to 2.3 for the remaining period of the year. There is a good opportunity in island and coastal areas for the application of wind mills for pumping and electrification. But during the summer and monsoon seasons (March to October) there can be very low-pressure areas and storm wind speeds 200 to 300 km/h can be expected. Wind turbines have to be strong enough to withstand these high wind speeds.

Tidal power 
The tides at Chittagong Division are predominantly semidiurnal with a large variation in range corresponding to the seasons, the maximum occurring during the south-west monsoon. In 1984, an attempt was made by mechanical engineering department of KUET to assess the feasibility of tidal energy in the coastal regions of Bangladesh, especially at Cox's Bazar and at the islands of Maheshkhali and Kutubdia. The average tidal range was found within 4-5 meter and the amplitude of the spring tide exceeds even 6 meter.  From different calculations, it is anticipated that there are a number of suitable sites at Cox's Bazar, Maheshkhali, Kutubdia and other places where permanent basins with pumping arrangements might be constructed which would be a double operation scheme.

Waste to electric energy 
In order to save the large cities from environmental pollution, the waste management as well as electricity generation from the solid wastes programme is being taken by the government.

Biogas 
There mainly two types of biogas plants used in Bangladesh, floating dome type and fixed dome type. Bag type plants are also used in the country but rarely.

Geothermal energy 
Geothermal potential of Bangladesh is yet to be determined. Different studies carried out by geologists have suggested possible geothermal resources in the northwest and southeast region. Among the studied areas of northwest region, Singra-Kuchma-Bogra area, Barapukuria coal basin area, and the Madhyapara hard rock mine area − with temperature gradient above 30 °C/km and bottom hole temperature in excess of 100 °C− meet the requirements of binary cycle power plants. But to reach a foregone conclusion on exploiting the resource in a viable, feasible and economically profitable way, extensive research is required. In 2011, Anglo MGH Energy, a Dhaka-based private company announced the construction of 200 MW geothermal plant, first ever of such kind, in Thakurgaon district. But for some unknown reasons, this project never commenced, and no development in this field has been announced afterwards.

The benefits of renewable energy in Bangladesh
Expanding capacity in the electricity sector can be achieved cost-effectively through clean energy options (renewables and energy efficiency), which not only reduce greenhouse gas emissions, but also increase jobs and improve human health by reducing air pollution. According to a report from the Low Emission Development Strategies Global Partnership (LEDS GP) and based on detailed modelling analysis, the benefits of increasing clean energy in Bangladesh's power generation mix relative to ‘business-as-usual’ could generate the following cumulative results by 2030:
reduce greenhouse gas emissions by up to 20% 
generate domestic employment of up to 55,000 full-time equivalent jobs
 Potential to produce additional electricity of 30 GW from the utilisation of solar PV and 53 gigawatt (GW) of electricity potential from all solar sources.
save up to 27,000 lives, and over US$5 billion (BDT 420 billion).

See also

Climate change in Bangladesh
Electricity sector in Bangladesh
Renewable energy policy of Bangladesh

References

External links